The Bethune–Cookman Wildcats football team represents Bethune–Cookman University in the sport of college football. The Wildcats compete in the Division I Football Championship Subdivision (FCS) of the National Collegiate Athletic Association (NCAA). Starting with the fall 2021 season, they compete in the East Division of the Southwestern Athletic Conference (SWAC), after having been members of the Mid-Eastern Athletic Conference (MEAC) since 1979. They play their home games at Daytona Stadium. The Wildcats have won two black college football national championships and seven MEAC titles in the history of their football program.

History

Classifications
1951–1972: NCAA College Division
1973–1979: NCAA Division II
1980–present: NCAA Division I–AA/FCS

Conference memberships
1925–1945: Independent
1946–1949: Southeastern Athletic Conference
1950–1979: Southern Intercollegiate Athletic Conference
1979–2020: Mid-Eastern Athletic Conference
 2021–present: Southwestern Athletic Conference

Conference championships

Black College Football National Championships
The Wildcats have won two Black College Football National Championships, a mythical national championship won by the best black college football team(s) in the United States of America.

Playoff appearances

NCAA Division I-AA/FCS
The Wildcats have appeared in the I-AA/FCS playoffs five times with an overall record of 0–5.

NCAA Division II
The Wildcats appeared in the Division II playoffs one time, with an overall record of 0–1.

Alumni in the NFL
Over 31 Bethune–Cookman alumni have played in the NFL, including:
Leroy Allen
Boobie Clark
Nick Collins
Charles Cornelius
Jawill Davis
Ryan Davis
Roger Jackson
Larry Little
Rashean Mathis
Jack "Cy" McClairen
Maulty Moore
Booker Reese
Tony Samuels
Howard Smothers
Eric Weems
Lee Williams
Alvin Wyatt
Antwuan Wyatt

Pro Football Hall of Fame
One former BCU football player has  been inducted into the Pro Football Hall of Fame.

Buck Buchanan Award
The Buck Buchanan Award is given to the most outstanding defensive player in Division I FCS.  In 2002, Rashean Mathis of Bethune- Cookman won the award.  Mathis holds the NCAA FCS/ I-AA records for most interceptions in a season (14), most interceptions during a career (31), most yards on interception returns in a season (455), and most yards on interception returns in a career (682).

See also
 Florida Classic

References

External links
 

 
American football teams established in 1925
1925 establishments in Florida